Swinhoe's snipe, (Gallinago megala), also known as forest snipe or Chinese snipe, is a medium-sized (length 27–29 cm, wingspan 38–44 cm, weight 120 gm), long-billed, migratory wader.

The common name commemorates the British naturalist Robert Swinhoe who first described the species in 1861.

Identification
It is identifiable as a Gallinago snipe by its cryptically patterned black, brown, buff and white plumage, but it is not easily distinguished from Latham's and pin-tailed snipe in the field. The species is commonly referred to as a cho suekyung in South Korea.

Distribution
It breeds mainly in central and southern Siberia and Mongolia. The entire population migrates and spends the non-breeding season principally in eastern and southern India, Sri Lanka, south-eastern China, South-East Asia and New Guinea. It has been recorded on migration in eastern China and occasionally in Japan. Records in Australia are mainly from the Top End of the Northern Territory and from north-western Western Australia.

Habitat
Breeding habitat: forest glades and meadows. Non-breeding habitat: shallow freshwater wetlands of various kinds including paddy fields and sewage farms, with bare mud or shallow water for feeding, with nearby vegetation cover.

Food
Mainly small invertebrates including earthworms, mollusks and insects.

Breeding
Display flights and drumming by the males.

Conservation
Because of wide range and no evidence of significant population decline, the species is assessed as being of least concern.

References

 BirdLife International. (2006). Species factsheet: Gallinago megala. Downloaded from http://www.birdlife.org on 9 February 2007
 Higgins, P.J.; & Davies, J.N. (eds). (1996). Handbook of Australian, New Zealand and Antarctic Birds.  Volume 3: Snipe to Pigeons. Oxford University Press: Melbourne.  
 Lane, Brett; & Davies, Jeff. (1987). Shorebirds in Australia. RAOU: Melbourne. 
 National Photographic Index of Australian Wildlife. (1987). The Shorebirds of Australia. Angus & Robertson: Sydney.

Further reading

Identification

 Carey, Geoff and Urban Olsson (1995) Field Identification of Common, Wilson's, Pintail and Swinhoe's Snipes Birding World 8(5): 179-190

Swinhoe's snipe
Shorebirds
Birds of Manchuria
Birds of Mongolia
Birds of North Asia
Migratory birds (Eastern Hemisphere)
Birds described in 1861
Taxa named by Robert Swinhoe